Camillo Berlinghieri (1590  or 1605  – 1635) was an Italian painter of the Baroque period. Born in Ferrara. He trained with Carlo Bononi. Among his paintings was a Gathering of the Manna in San Niccolo; and an Annunciation for Sant Antonio Abbate in Ferrara. His works are chiefly at  Ferrara and at Venice, where he was called Il Ferraresino. He died at Ferrara.

References

Year of birth unknown
1635 deaths
16th-century Italian painters
Italian male painters
17th-century Italian painters
Painters from Ferrara
Italian Baroque painters
Year of birth uncertain